Phyllonorycter lantanae is a moth of the family Gracillariidae. It is known from South Africa and Kenya.

The length of the forewings is 1.9 mm. The forewings are ochreous golden with white markings. The hindwings and fringe are pale fuscous. Adults are on wing in mid-April in southern Africa and in late November near the equator.

The larvae feed on Lantana species, including Lantana rugosa. They mine the leaves of their host plant. The mine has the form of a very small, oblong, semi-transparent, tentiform mine on the underside of the leaf.

References

Moths described in 1961
lantanae
Moths of Africa